This is a list of countries by the proportion of the population that has attained at least a secondary education. The list is composed of the percent of the  population of the relevant age groups that have completed an upper secondary education in the listed countries. The lists are compiled from several sources.

List of countries by percent secondary education attainment for selected age groups

References

Lists of countries
Lists of countries by population-related issue
Education-related lists